WSDH (91.5 FM) is a high school radio station licensed to Sandwich, Massachusetts, United States and serving the Cape Cod area.  The station is owned by Sandwich, Massachusetts Public Schools.  It is operated by Cape Cod Community College. WSDH had rebroadcast WBUR until 2014 and since the end of 2021 rebroadcasts 90.7 WKKL from Cape Cod Community College in West Barnstable, Massachusetts. Wkkl.fm

References

External links

SDH
High school radio stations in the United States
Sandwich, Massachusetts
Radio stations established in 1976
1976 establishments in Massachusetts